The 2011 IIHF World Championship rosters consisted of 397 players from 16 national ice hockey teams. Organised by the International Ice Hockey Federation (IIHF), the 2011 IIHF World Championship, held in Bratislava and Košice, Slovakia, was the 75th edition of the tournament. Finland won the tournament for the second time defeating Sweden 6–1 in the final.

Before the start of the tournament, each participating nation had to submit a list of players for its roster. A minimum of 15 skaters and two goaltenders and a maximum of 20 skaters and three goaltenders had to be selected. After the start of the tournament, each team was allowed to add additional players to their roster, for a maximum of 25. Once players were registered to the team, they could not be removed from the roster.

To have qualified for the national team under IIHF rules, a player must have met several criteria. He must be a citizen of the nation, and be under the jurisdiction of that national association. Players are allowed to change which national team they represent, providing they fulfill the IIHF criteria. If participating for the first time in an IIHF event, the player was required to have played two consecutive years in the national competition of the new country without playing in another country. If the player has already played for a national team before, he may switch countries if he is a citizen of the new country, and has played for four consecutive years in the national competition of the new country. This switch may happen only once in the player's life.

Viktor Fasth of Sweden was named the tournament's most valuable player and top goaltender by the IIHF directorate. Canadian Alex Pietrangelo was named the top defenceman and Jaromír Jágr of the Czech Republic was selected as the top forward. Finland's Jarkko Immonen was the tournament's leading scorer with 12 points and Petri Vehanen was the leading goaltender with a save percentage of 0.954.



Legend

Austria
Head coach:

Skaters

Goaltenders

Belarus
Head coach:

Skaters

Goaltenders

Canada
Head coach:

Skaters

Goaltenders

Czech Republic
Head coach:

Skaters

Goaltenders

Denmark
Head coach:

Skaters

Goaltenders

Finland
Head coach:

Skaters

Goaltenders

France
Head coach:

Skaters

Goaltenders

Germany
Head coach:

Skaters

Goaltenders

Latvia
Head coach:

Skaters

Goaltenders

Norway
Head coach:

Skaters

Goaltenders

Russia
Head coach:

Skaters

Goaltenders

Slovakia
Head coach:

Skaters

Goaltenders

Slovenia
Head coach:

Skaters

Goaltenders

Sweden
Head coach:

Skaters

Goaltenders

Switzerland
Head coach:

Skaters

Goaltenders

United States
Head coach:

Skaters

Goaltenders

References

Player statistics

Team rosters

rosters
IIHF World Championship rosters